Edison High School is a public high school located in Huntington Beach, California which first began operation in 1969. It is a part of the Huntington Beach Union High School District. Edison is a California Distinguished School. The graduation rate at Edison is 94%. Thirty-three percent of Edison graduates attend a four-year university and 61% attend community college or trade school. Twenty five total AP, Honors, and Accelerated level courses are offered at Edison. Edison is a largely sports-centered high school, with 31 CIF championships and 255 League championships.

History
The school was built on land donated by Southern California Edison, from which its name is derived.

Academic programs

Academy of Sustainability and Engineering 
The Academy of Sustainability and Engineering at Edison (ASE) is a STEAM-based program which emphasizes real-life application of mathematics and sciences. The program is directed by Andrea Harrell. ASE students take slightly specialized math and science classes which are directed towards sustainability and engineering. The ASE program and, specifically, students who are ASE Lab Specialists, often use the Innovation Lab, an area at Edison which implements sustainable aquaponics systems, houses a variety of marine specimens, and is used by the robotics team, among other features. The establishment of the Innovation Lab was spearheaded by Edison science teacher and Assistant Director of ASE Greg Gardiner. Gardiner was named 2018 California Teacher of the Year for his ability to engage students, his work with developmentally disabled students, his hands-on teaching style, and his positive energy. ASE also runs several gardens at Edison which showcase native plants such as succulents in their natural habitats. All ASE students participate in a stewardship event, in which they take part in some type of action that will positively affect the local environment. ASE also offers a Robotics and Hydrogen Fuel Cell Program, which competes against other schools, as well as an E-sports team.

Model United Nations 
 
The Model United Nations (MUN) program at Edison simulates United Nations committees in order to teach students skills of research, public speaking, debating, and writing, as well as critical thinking, teamwork, and leadership. This Honors-level program also teaches students basic social studies information alongside MUN assignments, projects, and conferences. After Freshman year, a typically small cut occurs, allowing only two classes (seventy-four students) as Sophomores in MUN. After Sophomore year, the program is reduced to one class, which remains until Senior year.

Notable alumni
Willie Aames,  American actor, director, producer
Mark Boyer, former NFL player
Jack Clark, Rugby player, coach, and U.S. Rugby Hall of Fame
Rick DiBernardo, Former professional football player (NFL)
Austin D’Amond, drummer for heavy metal band Bleed The Sky
Marcus Epps, football player
Jonathan Fahn: voice/TV/film actor, as well as an award-winning film and stage director, producer, and writer.
Joy Fawcett, soccer player
Eric Filia, baseball player
Julio Gonzalez, boxer
Lisa Guerrero, journalist
Kyle Higashioka, baseball player
Donnie Hill, MLB baseball player
Jeff Kent, former baseball player
Margaret Ketchersid (1993), winner of Why Mom Deserves a Diamond, essay contest
Henry Owens, (MLB) baseball player
Tori Pena, pole vaulter
Tom Shields, Olympic swimmer 
Yevgeni Starikov, soccer player
Dale Thayer, baseball player
Doug Webb, musician
Scott Weiland, Stone Temple Pilots singer

References

External links
 Edison High School

Educational institutions established in 1969
High schools in Orange County, California
Buildings and structures in Huntington Beach, California
Education in Huntington Beach, California
Public high schools in California
1969 establishments in California